Chotýšany is a municipality and village in Benešov District in the Central Bohemian Region of the Czech Republic. It has about 600 inhabitants.

Administrative parts
Villages of Křemení, Městečko and Pařezí are administrative parts of Chotýšany.

Gallery

References

Villages in Benešov District